Feliz Deserto is a municipality located in the south of the Brazilian state of Alagoas. Its population is 4,779 (2020) and its area is 92 km².

References

Populated coastal places in Alagoas
Municipalities in Alagoas